

References

1990
Soviet
Films